20th Century Masters – The Millennium Collection: The Best of Maureen McGovern is a 12-track collection of songs that Maureen McGovern recorded for 20th Century Records, which was the first label that she signed with. All seven of her singles for the label are featured on this CD, two of which make their first appearance on an album ("Even Better Than I Know Myself" and "Love Songs Are Getting Harder to Sing"). Inside the album cover are McGovern's discography for 20th Century and a biographical essay written by Gordon Pogoda. Eleven of the 12 songs make their compact disc debut on this release and had only been previously available on LPs and 45s. Three of McGovern's movie themes ("The Morning After," "We May Never Love Like This Again," and "Nice to Be Around") are featured on the CD, while a fourth movie theme that McGovern recorded for 20th Century Records, "Wherever Love Takes Me," can be found in the CD format on the Elmer Bernstein soundtrack to Gold. This CD covers McGovern's recording period from 1972 to 1975 and includes seven songs from her 1974 LP Nice to Be Around.

Track listing

Critical reception 

This album received four out of five stars from James Christopher Monger of Allmusic. In his review, Monger states that several of the songs featured on the collection are able to showcase McGovern's lovely four-octave range and that the collection is definitely worth looking into. However, he also mentions the fact that McGovern also added "cabaret and classical offerings" to her repertoire and that all the songs on this collection "remain firmly rooted in the pop idiom".

Album credits 
 Compilation Produced by: Gordon Pogoda and Bill Levenson
 Mastered by: Ellen Fitton at Universal Mastering Studios East
 Essay by: Gordon Pogoda
 Art direction: Vartan
 Design: Add To The Noise
 Photo coordination: Ryan Null
 Photos: Michael Ochs Archives
 Production manager: Adam Abrams
 Licensing: Jenny Shapiro
 Marketing: Ashley Culp

References 

Maureen McGovern compilation albums
McGovern, Maureen
2005 greatest hits albums
Mercury Records compilation albums
Albums produced by Gordon Pogoda